Karl McCartney (born November 29, 1987) is a professional Canadian football linebacker who is currently a free agent. He was drafted 37th overall by the Stampeders in the 2010 CFL Draft and signed a contract with the team on May 20, 2010. He played college football for the Saint Mary's Huskies.

References

External links
Calgary Stampeders

1987 births
Living people
Canadian football linebackers
Calgary Stampeders players
Sportspeople from Nassau, Bahamas
Saint Mary's Huskies football players